Mallaber is a surname. Notable people with the surname include:

Gary Mallaber (born 1946), American musician
Judy Mallaber (born 1951), English politician